Aaron Benjamin Herman (born February 17, 1953) is an American rower. He competed in the men's coxed pair event at the 1972 Summer Olympics. He graduated from the University of Pennsylvania in 1974.

References

External links
 

1953 births
Living people
American male rowers
Olympic rowers of the United States
Rowers at the 1972 Summer Olympics
Sportspeople from Stamford, Connecticut
University of Pennsylvania alumni